You, John Jones! (1943) is a short film directed by Mervyn LeRoy, written by Carey Wilson, and released by Metro-Goldwyn-Mayer, and starring James Cagney, Ann Sothern, and Margaret O'Brien. The film credits the War Activities Committee of the Motion Picture Industry for its production. The title frame also says "Produced by Metro-Goldwyn-Mayer as their contribution to United Nations Week".

Plot
The film begins with a father and worker (Cagney) working at an armaments factory, until he  finally gets off and goes home. When he is at home, he is interrupted from listening to his daughter's recitation of Abraham Lincoln's Gettysburg Address to go out for the Civil Defense on an air-raid patrol. When he is out at his post he feels a little silly being there, as no air raids have hit America, though they have hit America's allies.

He then goes off into a dream sequence, narrated by God, about the various areas in which air raids and other violence has been brought on civilians, by air and other means. Each vignette ends with a small child dead or wounded and the narrator asking him, what if it was "your baby, John Jones, your baby" the dream sequence ends with an air attack, after which Jones finally awakes. He returns to his house and his daughter finishes the recitation of the Gettysburg Address "...so that government by the people, for the people, and of the people shall not perish from this Earth."

External links 
 
 

1943 films
American World War II propaganda shorts
1940s English-language films
Films directed by Mervyn LeRoy
American black-and-white films
American war drama films
1940s war drama films
1944 drama films
1944 films
1943 drama films
1940s American films